Christer Ulfbåge (born 7 May 1942, in Falköping, Sweden), is a Swedish sports journalist and commentator and earlier presenter of Sportspegeln and Sportnytt which are broadcast on SVT. Ulfbåge was for many years commentator for SVTs sports broadcasts of skiing, athletics. He started his career at Radiosporten at Sveriges Radio where between 1974 and 1980 amongst others he covered the achievements of Ingemar Stenmark. In 1991, he reported from the World Championships final for 100 meters in Tokyo.

References

External links

Living people
1942 births
Swedish sports journalists